The 1985 Nabisco Grand Prix was a professional men's tennis circuit held that year. It consisted of 71 tournaments held in 19 different countries. The tour incorporated the four ITF grand slam tournaments, three World Championship Tennis tournaments and the Grand Prix tournaments. Total prize money for the circuit was $23 million. The circuit was administered by the Men's International Professional Tennis Council (MIPTC). In November 1985 the MIPTC sued player–management agencies ProServ and IMG alleging that these firms were holding the tennis game hostage and were 'exerting extensive power over players'.

The 1985 circuit marked the last time the Australian Open was held in November before moving to its current slot in January. In January 1986 at an awards ceremony in New York the ATP players elected Ivan Lendl as the 1985 ATP Player of the Year. Lendl won the most tournament titles, played the most finals, was the points leader of the Grand Prix circuit and finished the year as no.1 in the ATP ranking. The Grand Slam tournaments were won by four different players (Wilander, Edberg, Becker, Lendl) and for the first time since 1934 all winners were European.

Schedule
The table below shows the 1985 Nabisco Grand Prix schedule (a precursor to the ATP Tour).

Key

January

February

March

April

May

June

July

August

September

October

November

December

January 1986

Standings
The 1985 Grand Prix tournaments were divided in 18 separate point categories, ranging from the Grand Slam tournaments (700 points for the Singles winner and 120 points for Doubles winner) to the smallest Regular Series tournaments (80 points for the Singles winner and 15 points for Doubles winner). At the end of the year the top 64 Singles players and top 24 Doubles players received bonuses from a $4,000,000 bonus pool. To qualify for a bonus a player must have participated in at least 14 tournaments. The best 16 players in the points standing at the end of the season qualified for the Nabisco Masters which was played in January 1986.

ATP rankings

List of tournament winners
The list of winners and number of Grand Prix singles titles won, alphabetically by last name:
 Matt Anger (1) Johannesburg
 Paul Annacone (1) Brisbane
 Boris Becker (3) Queen's Club, Cincinnati, Wimbledon
 Jonathan Canter (1) Melbourne
 Sergio Casal (1) Florence
 Kevin Curren (1) Toronto Indoor
 Marty Davis (2) Bristol, Melbourne Indoor
 Scott Davis (1) Tokyo Outdoor
 Stefan Edberg (4) Memphis, San Francisco, Basel, Australian Open
 Eddie Edwards (1) Adelaide
 Brad Gilbert (3) Livingston, Cleveland, Tel Aviv
 Andrés Gómez (1) Hong Kong
 Tom Gullikson (1) Newport
 Jan Gunnarsson (1) Vienna
 Martín Jaite (1) Buenos Aires
 Anders Järryd (1) Brussels
 Johan Kriek (1) Las Vegas
 Henri Leconte (2) Nice, Sydney Outdoor
 Ivan Lendl (11) Fort Myers, Monte Carlo, Dallas, Forest Hills, Indianapolis, US Open, Stuttgart Outdoor, Sydney Indoor, Tokyo Indoor, Wembley, Masters
 Peter Lundgren (1) Cologne
 Chris Lewis (1) Auckland
 Andreas Maurer (1) Madrid
 Tim Mayotte (1) Delray Beach
 John McEnroe (9) Masters, Philadelphia, Houston, Milan, Chicago, Atlanta, Stratton Mountain, Montreal, Stockholm
 Miloslav Mečíř (2) Rotterdam, Hamburg
 Yannick Noah (3) Rome, Washington, D.C., Toulouse
 Joakim Nyström (2) Munich, Gstaad
 Ricki Osterthun (1) Hilversum
 Claudio Panatta (1) Bari
 Horacio de la Peña (1) Marbella
 Diego Pérez (1) Bordeaux
 Pavel Složil (1) Kitzbühel
 Tomáš Šmíd (1) Geneva
 Larry Stefanki (1) La Quinta
 Thierry Tulasne (2) Bologna, Palermo
 Mats Wilander (3) Boston, French Open, Båstad
 Tim Wilkison (1) Nancy

The following players won their first title in 1985:
 Matt Anger Johannesburg
 Paul Annacone Brisbane
 Boris Becker Queen's Club
 Jonathan Canter Melbourne
 Sergio Casal Florence
 Eddie Edwards Adelaide
 Tom Gullikson Newport
 Jan Gunnarsson Vienna
 Martín Jaite Buenos Aires
 Chris Lewis Auckland
 Peter Lundgren Cologne
 Andreas Maurer Madrid
 Tim Mayotte Delray Beach
 Miloslav Mečíř Rotterdam
 Ricki Osterthun Hilversum
 Claudio Panatta Bari
 Horacio de la Peña Marbella
 Diego Pérez Bordeaux
 Larry Stefanki La Quinta
 Thierry Tulasne Bologna

See also
 1985 Virginia Slims World Championship Series

References

External links
ATP 1985 results archive
ATP History – How It All Began

Further reading

 
Grand Prix
Grand Prix tennis circuit seasons